Mount Kitchener is a mountain located within the Columbia Icefield of Jasper National Park, which is part of the Canadian Rockies. The mountain can be seen from the Icefields Parkway (highway 93) near Sunwapta Pass.

Mt. Kitchener was originally named Mount Douglas by J. Norman Collie after David Douglas. In 1916, the mountain was renamed Mount Kitchener, its present-day name, after Lord Kitchener, who had just been killed in World War I.

Climbing 
Routes
 SouthWest Slopes (Normal Route) I
 Grand Central Couloir V 5.9
 Ramp Route V 5.8

Notable ascents
 1975 Grand Central Couloir (V 5.9 WI5 1050m) by Jeff Lowe and Michael Weis (August 1975)

Mount K2

Mount K2, elevation 3,090m, was named in 1938 by Rex Gibson (former Alpine Club of Canada president), apparently to signify this as a secondary peak of Mount Kitchener.

Climate
Based on the Köppen climate classification, Mount Kitchener is located in a subarctic climate zone with cold, snowy winters, and mild summers. Temperatures can drop below  with wind chill factors below .

References

External links
 
 Parks Canada web site: Jasper National Park

Gallery

Three-thousanders of Alberta
Winston Churchill Range
Mountains of Jasper National Park